The 1988 Central and Western District Board election was held on 10 March 1988 to elect all 13 elected to the 20-member Central and Western District Board.

Overall election results
Before election:

Change in composition:

Results by constituency

Chung Wan

Kennedy Town East

Kennedy Town West and Mount Davis

Middle Levels and Peak

Sai Ying Pun East

Sai Ying Pun West

Sheung Wan

References

Central and Western District Board election
Central and Western District Council elections